The Nikon 1 V3 is a digital mirrorless camera announced by Nikon on March 13, 2014.

Compared to its predecessor, the Nikon 1 V2, it has a higher resolution sensor (18 megapixels, up from 14 megapixels), built-in Wifi, FullHD video at 60 frames per second (non-interpolated), up to 120 frames per second video at 720p resolution, 20fps continuous AF, and 171 focus points, which Nikon claims gives better tracking autofocus than even DSLR cameras.

See also
 Nikon 1 series
 Nikon 1-mount

References

http://www.dpreview.com/products/nikon/slrs/nikon_v3/specifications

Nikon MILC cameras
V3
Cameras introduced in 2014